Hires may refer to:
 High Resolution Fly's Eye, ultra-high-energy cosmic ray observatory
 High Resolution Echelle Spectrometer or High Resolution Echelle Spectrograph, W. M. Keck Observatory's spectrometer
 Hires Big H, restaurant chain headquartered in Utah, U.S.
 Hires Root Beer
 Hires (surname)

See also
Hire (disambiguation)